The 2022 Wyoming elections took place on November 8, 2022. The Statewide Direct Primary Election were held on Aug 16, 2022. Wyoming voters elected Wyoming's seat to the United States House of Representatives, all of the seats of the Wyoming House of Representatives, all even-numbered seats of the Wyoming Senate, and the Governor of Wyoming and various statewide offices.

United States Congress

House of Representatives 

Incumbent Liz Cheney was criticized by former president Donald Trump and his supporters mainly for her vote to impeach him, as well as refusing to object to the certification of the electoral college results in the 2020 presidential election. Shortly after her impeachment vote, Trump and allies stated that they will work together to back and endorse a primary challenger to Cheney before the 2022 election.

Statewide constitutional offices

Governor

Incumbent Republican governor Mark Gordon is eligible to run for re-election, and has stated that he intends to do so.

Secretary of State 

Incumbent Republican Wyoming Secretary of State Edward Buchanan initially run for re-election but later choosing not to seek a second term.

Treasurer
Incumbent Republican Curt Meier won re-election.

Auditor
Incumbent Republican Wyoming State Auditor Kristi Racines ran for reelection without opposition.

Superintendent of Public Instruction

Megan Degenfelder defeated appointee Brian Schroeder in the Republican primary. Schroeder had been appointed following the resignation of incumbent Jillian Balow, who resigned to become the Virginia Superintendent of Public Instruction after being appointed by Virginia governor Glenn Youngkin. Degenfelder won the general election against Democrat Sergio Maldanodo.

Republican primary

Candidates
Brian Schroeder, incumbent Superintendent of Public Instruction
Megan Degenfelder, former Chief Policy Officer under superintendent Jillian Balow
Thomas Kelly (withdrawn), chair of the political and military science department at the American Military University
Robert J. White III, trona miner
Jennifer Zerba, cosmetologist

Results

Results

State Legislature

Wyoming Senate 

Of the 30 seats in the Wyoming Senate, 15 were up for election in 2022.

Wyoming House of Representatives 

All 60 seats in the Wyoming House of Representatives were up for election in 2022, plus two additional seats added in redistricting.

References

External links
 
 
  (State affiliate of the U.S. League of Women Voters)

 
Wyoming